Edwin Laurentine Drake (March 29, 1819 – November 9, 1880), also known as Colonel Drake, was an American businessman and  the first American to successfully drill for oil.

Early life
Edwin Drake was born in Greenville, New York on March 29, 1819, the son of Lyman and Laura Drake. He grew up on family farms around New York state and Castleton, Vermont before leaving home at the age of 19.  He spent the early parts of his life working the railways around New Haven, Connecticut as a clerk, express agent and a conductor. During this time, in 1845, he married Philena Adams who died while giving birth to their second child in 1854. Drake remarried three years later to Laura Dowd, sixteen years his junior, in 1857.  During this summer, illness prevented Drake from carrying on with his job. He retained the privileges of a train conductor, including free travel on the railroads. By 1858, the Drake family found themselves living in Titusville, Pennsylvania.

Drake was a Freemason.

Seneca Oil
While petroleum oil was known prior to this, there was no appreciable market for it. Samuel Martin Kier is credited with founding the first American oil refinery in Pittsburgh.  He was the first person in the United States to refine crude oil into lamp oil (kerosene).  Along with a new lamp to burn Kier's product a new market to replace whale oil as a lamp oil began to develop.

Seneca Oil, originally called the Pennsylvania Rock Oil Company , was founded by George Bissell and Jonathan Eveleth. They created the company after hearing of reports that petroleum collected from an oil spring in Titusville, Pennsylvania was suitable for use as lamp fuel. Until this time, the primary lamp fuel had been whale oil. Bissell found that the "rock oil" would be a practical alternative if a method could be devised to extract the oil from the ground. Interest in the Pennsylvania Rock Oil Company was initially low until a report commissioned by Bissell and Eveleth showed that there was significant economic value in petroleum. Due to a disagreement between the shareholders and the pair, the company was split and Seneca Oil was formed in 1858.  Before being offered a job by Bissell and Eveleth, Drake bought stock in Seneca Oil.  But his job opportunity with the company arose because both parties were staying in the same hotel in Titusville. He was hired on a salary of $1,000 a year to investigate the oil seeps on land owned by Seneca Oil.

Oil drilling

 
Edwin Drake was hired by the Seneca Oil Company to investigate suspected oil deposits in Titusville, Pennsylvania.  James Townsend, President of the Seneca Oil Company, sent Drake to the site in the spring of 1858. The oil company chose the retired railway man partly because he had free use of the rail. Drake had no military experience, but Townsend gave him the title of "Colonel" in order to impress the local townspeople. 

Drake decided to drill in the manner of salt well drillers.  He purchased a steam engine in Erie, Pennsylvania, to power the drill.  The well was dug on an island on the Oil Creek. It took some time for the drillers to get through the layers of gravel. At 16 feet (5 m) the sides of the hole began to collapse. Those helping him began to despair, but not Drake. It was at this point that he devised the idea of a drive pipe. This cast iron pipe consisted of  joints. The pipe was driven down into the ground. At 32 feet (10 m) they struck bedrock. The drilling tools were now lowered through the pipe and steam was used to drill through the bedrock. The drilling, however, was slow. Progress was made at the rate of just three feet per day. After initial difficulty locating the necessary parts to build the well, which resulted in his well being nicknamed "Drake's Folly", Drake proved successful.

Meanwhile, crowds of people began to gather to jeer at the apparently unproductive operation. By 1859, Drake was also running out of money. Drake's colleagues back in Connecticut gave up on finding any oil by April 1859 and after spending $2,500, Drake took out a $500 loan to keep the operation going. On August 27, 1859, Drake had persevered and his drill bit had reached a total depth of 69.5 feet (21 m). At that point the bit hit a crevice. The men packed up for the day. The next morning Drake’s driller, Billy Smith, looked into the hole in preparation for another day’s work. He was surprised and delighted to see crude oil rising up. Drake was summoned and the oil was brought to the surface with a hand pitcher pump. The oil was collected in a bath tub.

Drake is famous for pioneering a new method for producing oil from the ground.  He drilled using piping to prevent borehole collapse, allowing for the drill to penetrate further and further into the ground. Previous methods for collecting oil had been limited.  Ground collection of oil consisted of gathering it from where it occurred naturally, such as from oil seeps or shallow holes dug into the ground. Drake tried the latter method initially when looking for oil near Titusville. However, it failed to produce economically viable amounts of oil. Alternative methods of digging large shafts into the ground also failed, as collapse from water seepage almost always occurred.  The significant step that Drake took was to drive a 32-foot iron pipe through the ground into the bedrock below. This allowed Drake to drill inside the pipe, without the hole collapsing from the water seepage. The principle behind this idea is still employed today by all companies drilling for hydrocarbons.

Claims of prior art exist, including Bóbrka, Poland in 1854, Wietze, Germany in 1857, and Oil Springs, Ontario, Canada in 1858. The importance of the Drake Well near Titusville was that it prompted the first great wave of investment and additional drilling that established petroleum as a major industry. Within a day of Drake's striking oil, Drake’s methods were being imitated by others along Oil Creek and in the immediate area. This culminated with the establishment of several oil boom towns along the creek.  Drake's well produced  of oil a day.  By 1872, the entire area was producing  a day.

Drake set up a stock company to extract and market the oil. But, while his pioneering work led to the growth of an oil industry that made many people fabulously rich, for Drake riches proved elusive. Drake did not possess good business acumen. He failed to patent his drilling invention, and proceeded to lose all of his savings in oil speculation in 1863. He was to end up as an impoverished old man, and in 1872 Pennsylvania voted an annuity of $1,500 to the "crazy man" whose determination founded the oil industry.

He died on November 9, 1880 in Bethlehem, Pennsylvania, where he had lived since 1874.  He and his wife are buried in Titusville, Pennsylvania next to a memorial built in his honor.

In popular culture
Edwin Drake and Billy Smith appear in À l'ombre des derricks ("In the Shadow of the Derricks"), an episode of the Franco-Belgian comics Western series Lucky Luke, published in 1960, written by René Goscinny (co-creator of Asterix) and drawn by Morris. The action takes place at Titusville where the black gold rush also attracts a crooked lawyer who takes over the town and the oilfields. Drake and Smith put an end to his reign of terror. Drake and Smith also appear in the animated television version of the story produced in the early 1980s.

Edwin Drake is portrayed by Richard Kiley in the January 10, 1964 edition of "The Great Adventure" history teleplay a CBS Television production entitled "The Colonel from Connecticut." 

Drake is portrayed by Vincent Price in the 1954 industrial film, Born In Freedom: The Story of Colonel Drake, sponsored by the American Petroleum Institute

See also
 Drake Well Museum
 Pennsylvania oil rush

References

External links

Drake Well
Pbs.org: Edwin Drake

1819 births
1880 deaths
19th-century American businesspeople
19th-century American inventors
American businesspeople in the oil industry
American Freemasons
Businesspeople from Pennsylvania
Founders of the petroleum industry
People from Bethlehem, Pennsylvania
People from Greenville (town), New York
People from Castleton, Vermont